The Cedar Lakes are a series of small lakes in geographic Palmer Township in the Unorganized North Part of Algoma in Northeastern Ontario, Canada.

The lakes are in the Great Lakes Basin, and the primary inflow, at the north end of the series, and outflow, at the south end of the series, is the Carp River. The Carp River flows to Lake Superior.

See also
List of lakes in Ontario

References

Other map sources:

Lakes of Algoma District